Stock footage, and similarly, archive footage, library pictures, and file footage is film or video footage that can be used again in other films. Stock footage is beneficial to filmmakers as it saves shooting new material. A single piece of stock footage is called a "stock shot" or a "library shot". Stock footage may have appeared in previous productions but may also be outtakes or footage shot for previous productions and not used. Examples of stock footage that might be utilized are moving images of cities and landmarks, wildlife in their natural environments, and historical footage. Suppliers of stock footage may be either rights managed or royalty-free. Many websites offer direct downloads of clips in various formats.

History
Stock footage companies began to emerge in the mid-1980s, offering clips mastered on Betacam SP, VHS, and film formats. Many of the smaller libraries that specialized in niche topics such as extreme sports, technological or cultural collections were bought out by larger concerns such as Corbis or Getty Images over the next couple of decades.

Films and television
Stock footage can be used to integrate news footage or notable figures into a film. For instance, the Academy Award-winning film Forrest Gump used stock footage extensively, modified with computer-generated imagery to portray the lead character meeting such historic figures such as John F. Kennedy, Richard Nixon, and John Lennon.

 News programs use film footage from their libraries when more recent images are not available. Such usage is often labeled on-screen with an indication that the footage being shown is file footage.

Television and movies series also often recycle footage taken from previous installments. For instance, the Star Trek franchise kept a large collection of starships, planets, backgrounds, and explosions, which would appear on a regular basis throughout Star Trek's five series and ten films, being used with minimal alteration. That kept production costs down as models, mattes, and explosions were expensive to create. The advances in computer graphics in the late 1990s and early 2000s helped to significantly reduce the cost of Star Trek's production and allowed for a much wider variety of shots than previous model and painting-based visuals. Other films that re-used film footage from previous productions include Transformers: Dark of the Moon, Blade Runner, Star Wars: Episode II – Attack of the Clones, Hitman, Jaws: The Revenge, Halloween II, Harry Potter and the Order of the Phoenix, Harry Potter and the Deathly Hallows – Part 1 & 2 and Bill & Ted's Excellent Adventure.

Some series, particularly those made for children, such as Power Rangers or Teletubbies, reuse footage that is shown in many episodes. Meant for a young audience, the approach increases viewers' familiarity between shows. This introduces problems such as the requirement to, for example, wear the same clothing and inconsistency can sometimes become a problem. When cleverly filmed it is possible to avoid many of these problems.

Many broadcast shows use stock-footage clips as establishing shots of a particular city, which imply that the show is shot on location when in fact, it may be shot in a backlot studio. One or two establishing shots of an exotic location such as the Great Wall of China, Easter Island, or French Polynesia will save production companies the major costs of transporting crew and equipment to those actual locations.

Stock footage is often used in commercials when there is not enough money or time for production. More often than not these commercials are political or issue-oriented in nature. Sometimes it can be used to composite moving images that create the illusion of having on-camera performers appear to be on location. The term B-roll may refer to stock footage or newly shot scenes.

Stock footage that appears on television screens or monitors shown in movies or television shows is referred to as "playback". In Anchorman: The Legend of Ron Burgundy, which was written by and starring Will Ferrell as a San Diego news anchor, the studio purchased archival 1970s clips from San Diego stock footage firm New & Unique Videos. The playback footage of a hurricane featured in Disney's Smart House came from the vaults of the same San Diego firm.

Stock footage also appears many a time in animated series which is mostly a transition to live-action stock footage.

One of the most common uses of stock footage is in documentaries. Use of stock footage allows the filmmaker to tell the story of historical events such as World War II Why We Fight series, to document modern underwater archaeology activities, or to supplement content in natural history documentaries. Budgets may not be sufficient to keep a production crew on site for long-term projects, and stock footage allows the producer to pick the moments in time that are most important to the story or to give context to historical events.

Several films that would otherwise be completely lost have surviving footage due to the film being used as a stock footage. For example, The Cat Creeps has some scenes preserved in the movie Boo, and scenes from Queen of the Night Clubs are preserved as stock footage in Winner Take All. If not for its use as stock footage, these films would be lost entirely.

Stock footage is also used in live reality TV shows such as I'm a Celebrity.

In the early 2020s, stock footage of studio audience applause and reactions was used in television shows in place of a live studio audience due to the then-current COVID-19 pandemic.

Corporate usage

Companies throughout the world use stock footage in their video productions for in-house meetings, annual conventions, seminars, and other events. It has become popular to videotape interviews of CEOs and other VIPs using a green screen backdrop. When the green is keyed out during post-production, stock footage or stock shots are inserted, to impart a particular message.

Public domain
One of the largest producers of public domain stock footage is the United States government. All videos produced by the United States military, NASA, and other agencies are available for use as stock footage. There are a number of companies that own the copyrights to large libraries of stock footage and charge filmmakers a fee for using it, but they rarely demand royalties. Stock footage comes from myriad sources including the public domain, other movies and television programs, news outlets, and purpose-shot stock footage.

Format

Evolution

With each introduction of new standard, it requires reshooting, rerendering, or rescanning the popular footage as well as new images to show the capabilities of the next standard. Betacam SP, VHS, and early digital footage was shot in standard-definition (SD), in 4:3 aspect ratio. Next came a higher resolution format, High Definition (HD), with a 16:9 aspect ratio, which is closer to cinema widescreen formats. Many stock-footage companies and producers were concerned that their libraries would become irrelevant.  Many companies are also including virtual reality (VR) and 360-degree video footage.

Container
Popular digital container formats include MOV (QuickTime File Format) AVI, FLV, MP4, and MXF, which are commonly used in non-linear editing system applications such as Avid, Final Cut Pro, and Adobe Premiere Pro.

Libraries
Notable stock footage libraries and archives include:

 Adobe Stock
 Al Jazeera Creative Commons
 Alamy
 Artlist
 Associated Press
 BBC: BBC Motion Gallery (1961–) and backstage.bbc.co.uk (2005–2010)
 Can Stock Photo
 CNN Collection (fmr. CNN ImageSource, from the CNN cable news broadcaster)
 Corbis Motion (now through Getty Images and Visual China Group)
 Dailymotion
 Depositphotos
 DVArchive
 Film Archives, Inc.
 Flickr
 Footagevault
 Fotosearch
 Framepool
 Getty Images
 Internet Archive
 iStock
 ITN Source
 NASA Images
 Nautilus Productions
 NBCUniversal Archives
 NHNZ
 Nimia
 Oddball Films
 Pexels
 Pixabay
 Pond5
 Producers Library Service
 Reuters
 Science Photo Library
 Shutterstock
 Stocksy United
 Vimeo
 Visual China Group

See also
Archival research
Clip show
Free content
Production music
Stock photography
Stock sound effect

References

Further reading
Bernard, S.C. and Rabin, K. Archival Storytelling: A Filmmaker's Guide to Finding, Using, and Licensing Third-Party Visuals and Music. Focal Press, 2008, 

 
Cinematic techniques
Footage

de:Footage